Zicker may refer to:

Klein Zicker, a village in the Thiessow municipality, Mecklenburg-Vorpommern, Germany
Groß Zicker, a village in the Gager municipality, Mecklenburg-Vorpommern, Germany
Zicker, the German name of Sikory, a village in West Pomeranian Voivodeship, Poland
Zicker See, a bay of the Mönchgut peninsula, Mecklenburg-Vorpommern, Germany